79 Squadron, 79th Squadron or No. 79 Squadron may refer to:

 Aviation squadrons 

 No. 79 Squadron RAAF, a unit of the Royal Australian Air Force 
 No. 79 Squadron RAF, a unit of the United Kingdom Royal Air Force 
 79th Fighter Squadron (United States), a unit of the United States Air Force
 79th Air Refueling Squadron, a unit of the United States Air Force 
 79th Rescue Squadron, a unit of the United States Air Force 

 Ground combat squadrons 
 79 Railway Squadron (United Kingdom), a unit of the United Kingdom Army's Royal Logistics Corps

See also
 79th Division (disambiguation)